Crassispira rhythmica is a species of sea snail, a marine gastropod mollusk in the family Pseudomelatomidae.

Description
The length of the shell attains 15 mm.

Distribution
This marine species occurs off Florida, USA and Barbados

References

 MELVILL, J. COSMO. "Descriptions of eight new species of the family Turridae and of a new species of Mitra." Journal of Molluscan Studies 17.4 (1927): 149-155.

External links
 
 

rhythmica
Gastropods described in 1927